The Scowcroft Group is an international business advisory firm managed by Brent Scowcroft, former National Security Advisor to U.S. President George H. W. Bush and Gerald Ford.

The company claims regional expertise in Asia, Latin America, Africa, Western and Eastern Europe, Russia, and the Middle East and consults in matters of political economy of emerging markets and has strong relationships with key political and industry decision-makers. The company provided strategic and investment advice to industry leaders in the telecommunications, insurance, aeronautics, energy, and financial products sectors. They also cater to foreign direct investors in the electronics, utilities, energy, and food industries; and investors in the fixed income, equity, and commodity markets around the world.

The Scowcroft Group includes the following people, according to their company web page:
Principal Members
 Brent Scowcroft
 James R. Dunlap
 Charles A. Gillespie, Jr.
 Walter H. Kansteiner, III
 Arnold Kanter
 Eric D. K. Melby
 Franklin Miller
 Virginia A. Mulberger
 Kevin G. Nealer
 James Pavitt
 Daniel B. Poneman
 Joel L. Shin

Senior Consultants
 David M. Sloan 
 Alex Slesar
 Andrei V. Arofikin
 Matt Sherman
 Emilio J. Cardénas
 Daniel Zhou
 Lawrence J. Twill

According to a March 2001 report, Selected Staff and Board Members of the Scowcroft Group included the following people:
The Scowcroft Team
 Brent Scowcroft
 Kevin Nealer
 Colin Powell
 Condoleezza Rice
 Richard Haass
 Ken Juster
 Howard Baker
 Carla Hills
 Robert Strauss
 Lawrence Eagleburger

These people have also been or are associates of the Scowcroft Group:
 Stephen J. Hadley

External links
 The Scowcroft Group Company web page.
 The 2001 Morse Target WASHINGTON’S MOVERS AND SHAKERS ON JAPAN March 2001
 The Forum For International Policy
 The Scowcroft Group and GlobeSecNine, Inc. Announce Strategic Alliance to Source Deals in Security Sector 22 February 2005.
 CFR Meeting Announcement "Making the World Safe for Nuclear Energy" Speaker: Daniel Bruce Poneman, Scowcroft Group

Scowcroft Group
Scowcroft Group